Dragovica is a settlement located in the Municipality of Nova Gorica in western Slovenia.

References

External links
Dragovica on Geopedia

Populated places in the City Municipality of Nova Gorica